Missouri State Board of Education (MSBE) is Missouri's board of education, headquartered in Jefferson City. The board of education is established in Article IX, Section 2a of the Missouri Constitution. The eight members of the Board of Education are elected to staggered eight-year terms. The Board serves as the state-level governing body for career and technical education programs provided by local school districts, community colleges and four-year institutions and helps determine educational policy for the state's primary and secondary schools.

Board Members
Board members include:
 Charles W. Shields, President
 O. Victor Lenz, Vice-President
 Kimberly Bailey
 Donald Claycomb
 Carol Hallquist
 Peter F. Herschend
 Mary Schrag
 Pamela Westbrooks-Hodge

See also
 Education in the United States
 State education agency
 Missouri Department of Elementary and Secondary Education
 Missouri Department of Higher Education

References

External links
 Official Website
  Missouri Comprehensive Data System Portal
Publications by or about Missouri State Board of Education at Internet Archive.

State Board of Education
Board of Education
State boards of education in the United States